Avanduse Parish was a rural municipality of Estonia, in Lääne-Viru County. The parish existed until 1950. The parish was re-established in 1992. The parish was liquidated in 2005.

References

Lääne-Viru County
Former municipalities of Estonia